Aldo Bini (30 July 1915 – 16 June 1993) was an Italian road bicycle racer. He won several one-day races, as well as four stages of Giro d'Italia in 1936–1937. He placed second at the 1936 World Championships and 48th in the 1938 Tour de France.

Major results

1935
1st, Giro dell'Emilia
1st, Giro del Piemonte
1936
1st, Giro del Piemonte
1st, Giro dell'Umbria
1st, Milano-Modena
1st, Stage 2, Giro d'Italia
1937
1st, Giro di Lombardia
1st, Milano-Modena
1st, Stages 13, 14 & 19b, Giro d'Italia
 Giro della provincia Milano (with Maurice Archambaud)
1938
1st, Milano-Modena
1940
1st, Coppa Bernocchi
1941
1st, Giro del Piemonte
1942
1st, Giro di Lombardia
1946
1st, Stage 5b, Giro d'Italia
1948
 Giro d'Italia Maglia Nera winner
1952
1st, Milano–Torino

References

External links 

Palmarès by velo-club.net 
Palmarès by memoire-du-cyclisme.net 
Palmarès by velo-club.net 

1915 births
1993 deaths
Italian Giro d'Italia stage winners
Italian male cyclists
People from Montemurlo
Sportspeople from the Province of Prato
Cyclists from Tuscany